St Anthony's Girls' Catholic Academy (formerly St Anthony's Girls' Catholic School) is a secondary school and sixth form located in Sunderland, Tyne and Wear, England.

It was established as a grammar school by the Sisters of Mercy in 1902 and relocated to the current site on Thornhill Terrace in 1939. The school became comprehensive in 1972 and became a voluntary aided school in 1976. The school achieved specialisms in technology in 1999 and languages in 2009, and converted to academy status in 2012.

St Anthony's Girls' Catholic Academy offers GCSEs and BTECs as programmes of study for pupils, while girls in the sixth form have the option to study from a range of A-levels and further BTECs.

The current head of school is Mrs Catherine Hammill, and the current executive head teacher is Mrs Francesca Craik.

References

External links
St Anthony's Girls' Catholic Academy official website

Secondary schools in the City of Sunderland
Sisters of Mercy schools
Educational institutions established in 1902
1902 establishments in England
Catholic secondary schools in the Diocese of Hexham and Newcastle
Girls' schools in Tyne and Wear
Academies in the City of Sunderland
Sunderland